The 1909 United Kingdom local elections took place in 1909 for municipal councils (including Urban Districts), as well as Rural districts.  Municipal elections in Ireland took place in January. Municipal elections across England and Wales, and for Londons Metropolitan Boroughs, were held on Monday 1 November. Scotland held municipal elections the following day.

London borough elections

Overall results
The elections were the fourth held for Londons Metropolitan Borough councils. Municipal Reform candidates performed well, and the party won several new councils (most prominently Battersea), solidifying the party's hold on London.

The following table shows the aggregate results for the 28 Metropolitan boroughs in London.

Results by borough

Municipal elections

References